KMER (940 AM) is an American radio station broadcasting on 940 kHz and is licensed to Kemmerer, Wyoming. It primarily broadcasts a country format, but occasionally broadcasts local high school football and basketball games from Kemmerer as well. KMER has national news at the top of the hour and weather during commercial breaks. KMER has a sister station KDWY 105.3 FM, which is licensed to Diamondville.

Prior to August 2006, KMER operated on 950 kHz with a higher power, 5,000 watts. It was formerly a daytimer, signing off at local sunset. In order to accommodate nearby KOVO AM 960's move from Provo, Utah to Bluffdale, Utah (which ultimately did not happen), KMER was forced to change its frequency from 950 to 940 and lower its power so as to not interfere with KOVO. Both stations were at the time owned by Simmons Media. KOVO did relocate their towers, however it is unclear if the frequency change was necessary.

Signal
KMER broadcasts from a tower located in Kemmerer, and with its 240-watt signal, covers much of southwestern Wyoming during the day.
When conditions are favorable, KMER can be heard much farther distances, such as Salt Lake City, Utah.

References

External links

MER
Country radio stations in the United States
Radio stations established in 1963
Lincoln County, Wyoming